Sharps Bedrooms is a privately owned fitted bedroom and home office retailer and manufacturer. The company has 77 showrooms across the United Kingdom, with its factory and headquarters in Bilston, West Midlands.

History 
Sharps Bedrooms was previously a subsidiary of HomeForm Group. In 2011, Homeform entered administration and Sharps was subsequently purchased by private equity firm Sun Capital Partners. In 2021, Sharps Bedrooms was purchased by Epiris. In 2019, the company's annual turnover exceeded £100 million.

Products
Sharps Bedrooms designs and manufactures fitted bedroom, living and home office furniture.

Related companies
Sharps Bedrooms was a subsidiary of a private equity fund managed by Sun European Partners, the European arm of Sun Capital Partners, a US-based private investment firm. Sharps Bedrooms is currently owned by Epiris, a private equity firm based in London.

References

External links

Online retailers of the United Kingdom
Furniture retailers of the United Kingdom
Retail companies established in 1973
1973　establishments in England
Companies based in the West Midlands (county)
2011 mergers and acquisitions